Jamie Delgado and Jamie Murray were the defending champions, but decided not to participate.
Croatian fourth-seeded pair Nikola Mektić and Ivan Zovko won this tournament. They won against their unseeded compatriots Marin Draganja and Dino Marcan 3–6, 6–0, [10–3] in the final match.

Seeds

Draw

Draw

References
 Doubles Draw

BMW Ljubljana Open - Doubles
BMW Ljubljana Open